Bárbara Elisabeth Arenhart (born 4 October 1986) is a Brazilian female handball goalkeeper for RK Krim and the Brazilian national team.

She is openly lesbian.

Achievements
Austrian League:
Winner: 2012, 2013, 2014
Austrian Cup:
Winner: 2012, 2013, 2014
Norwegian League:
Silver Medalist: 2011
Romanian League:
Finalist: 2015
Romanian Cup:
Winner: 2015
Supercupa României:
Winner: 2014
Spanish Cup:
Winner: 2008
EHF Cup Winners' Cup:
Winner: 2013
Baia Mare Champions Trophy:
Winner: 2014
Pan American Games:
Winner: 2011, 2015
World Championship:
Winner: 2013
Pan American Championship:
Winner: 2011, 2013, 2017
Silver Medalist: 2009
South American Championship:
Winner: 2013
Provident Cup:
Winner: 2013

Awards and recognition
All-Star Goalkeeper of the World Championship: 2013
Austrian Handball Federation Handballer of the Year – Women: 2013
Austrian Handball Federation Goalkeeper of the Year – Women: 2013
2016 Women's Four Nations Tournament: Best Goalkeeper
 All-Star Goalkeeper of the Pan American Championship: 2017

References

External links
 
 
 

1986 births
Living people
Brazilian female handball players
People from Novo Hamburgo
Expatriate handball players
Brazilian expatriate sportspeople in Austria
Brazilian expatriate sportspeople in Norway
Brazilian expatriate sportspeople in Spain
Brazilian expatriate sportspeople in Romania
Brazilian expatriate sportspeople in Denmark
Brazilian expatriate sportspeople in Hungary
Handball players at the 2011 Pan American Games
Handball players at the 2015 Pan American Games
Handball players at the 2019 Pan American Games
Brazilian people of German descent
CS Minaur Baia Mare (women's handball) players
Pan American Games gold medalists for Brazil
Pan American Games medalists in handball
Handball players at the 2016 Summer Olympics
Olympic handball players of Brazil
South American Games gold medalists for Brazil
South American Games medalists in handball
Competitors at the 2018 South American Games
Medalists at the 2015 Pan American Games
Medalists at the 2019 Pan American Games
Medalists at the 2011 Pan American Games
Lesbian sportswomen
LGBT handball players
Brazilian LGBT sportspeople
Handball players at the 2020 Summer Olympics
21st-century Brazilian LGBT people
Sportspeople from Rio Grande do Sul